Monika Merl (née Grądzka; born 21 September 1979 in Sztum, Poland) is a German 800 metres runner and former champion in the 800 meters in Germany.

Career
Merl finished fifth at the 2005 European Indoor Championships and competed at the 2004 World Indoor Championships, 2005 World Championships and the 2006 European Championships without reaching the finals.

Her personal best time is 2:00.16 minutes, achieved in August 2006 in Cologne.

She represented the athletics club TV Wattenscheid 01 prior to her retirement from the sport.

References

External links
 

1979 births
Living people
People from Sztum
Sportspeople from Pomeranian Voivodeship
Polish emigrants to Germany
German female middle-distance runners
German national athletics champions